Henry Reaney (18 September 1912 – 1 July 1990) was a New Zealand cricketer. He played in two first-class matches for Wellington from 1931 to 1933.

See also
 List of Wellington representative cricketers

References

External links
 

1912 births
1990 deaths
New Zealand cricketers
Wellington cricketers
Cricketers from Napier, New Zealand